Jean Paul Maurice Bucquet (22 March 1860 – 17 February 1921) was a French sports shooter. He competed in the men's trap event at the 1900 Summer Olympics.

References

External links
 

1860 births
1921 deaths
French male sport shooters
Olympic shooters of France
Shooters at the 1900 Summer Olympics
Sport shooters from Paris